Tourism in the Republic of Moldova focuses on the country's natural landscapes and its history. Wine tours are offered to tourists across the country. Vineyards/cellars include Cricova, Purcari, Ciumai, Romanești, Cojușna, Mileștii Mici. In 2015, Moldova received 2.85 million visitors.

Travel regulations 

CIS citizens do not need a visa to visit Moldova: Azerbaijan, Kyrgyzstan, Tajikistan, Armenia, Uzbekistan, Belarus, Ukraine, Georgia, Russia, Turkmenistan.

Since January 2007, Moldova has established a visa-free regime for the US, Canada, Japan, Switzerland, Israel.

From 2012 Moldova allows Turkish citizens to visit the country without having to obtain a visa.

There is a visa-free regime between the Republic of Moldova and citizens of the European Union (27 states), including Austria, Poland, the Netherlands, Romania, Slovenia, Germany, Hungary and others whose citizens can enter the Republic of Moldova without a visa for up to 90 days within any 180-day period.

Tourism options

Wine tourism  
The traditions of Moldovan wine are more than 7000 years old, so winemaking has become an integral part of Moldovan culture.  There are more than 150 wineries in the country that produce gorgeous wines, cognacs and champagne.  The apotheosis of the local alcoholic paradise is the annual National Wine Day, the largest wine festival in Eastern Europe, held on the first weekend of October.  From 2013 Moldova put its focus on implementing a EU model based on protected geographical indications (PGIs, which means the wine is originated in a particular region and its quality can be guaranteed).   This system now covers four growing areas of Valul lui Traian, Stefan Voda, Codru and Divin.  As the result, Moldova has made impressive progress in upgrading the quality of its wines over the last five years which was clearly appreciated by wine lovers and professionals across the world:
 In 2018 Moldovan wines won over 420 medals at such prestigious international contests as: Decanter World Wine Awards, Mundus Vini, Concours Mondial du Bruxelles, International Wine Challenge, etc.
 In 2019 with more Moldovan wines meeting the PGI standard the country's vintages earned over 800 medals in global competitions, 300 of them were gold ones. So it's no wonder that more and more wine connoisseurs around the world are enjoying unique Moldovan varieties: Purcari Pinot Grigio, Feteasca Neagra, Feteasca Alba, Feteasca Regala, Rara Neagra, Viorica.
 Milestii Mici is included in the Guinness Book as the winery with the largest collection of wines in the world (1.5 million bottles)
 Castel Mimi. The vineyards were planted by the governor of Bessarabia, Konstantin Mimi, in 1893, and a chateau was built in 1901.
 Poiana Wine. Brand new winery opened in 2018 in the heart of Moldovan Codri 
 Cricova is a real “underground city” 120 km long and with a collection of 1.25 million bottles of rare wines.
 Purcari was founded in 1827, and the quality of the wines is best illustrated by the fact that Negru de Purcari was the favorite wine of the British Queen Victoria.
 Chateau Vartely, arelatively new winery with two tasting rooms and a tourist complex.
 EtCetera, a family winery in the south-east of Moldova with hotel and swimming pool.

Religious tourism 
Moldova is an Orthodox country with deep Christian traditions. There are over 50 monasteries and 700 churches in the country. Most popular monasteries are:

 Curchi monastery
 Căpriana monastery
 Hâncu monastery
 Tipova monastery
 Saharna monastery
 Old Orhei monastery
 Noul Neamț Monastery

Attractions 

 Căpriana monastery - is one of the oldest monasteries of Moldova, located in Căpriana
 Central Chișinău
 Hâncu monastery
 Muzeul Memoriei Neamului - is a museum in Chişinău dedicated to the "victims of the Soviet occupation" of Bessarabia and Northern Bukovina, and commemorating anti-communist resistance in the region
 National History Museum of Moldova - is a museum in Central Chişinău
 Noul Neamț Monastery -  an all-male Moldovan Orthodox monastery located in Chiţcani
 Old Orhei - historical and archaeological complex, located in Trebujeni, Orhei National Park
 Saharna Monastery
 Soroca Fort - historic fort in the Republic of Moldova, in the modern-day city of Soroca.
 Mansion of Manuc Bey - is a museum near Chişinău

Gallery

Tourism Statistics
Tourists in Moldova by country of origin, 2015:

Tourists in Moldova by country of origin, 2018:

Climate 
Local climate is moderately continental, very reminiscent of the Mediterranean: winters are mild and short (in 2019 there was no snowfall at all), summers are hot and long (they start in early May and last till early October). The average temperature in January is −4 °C, in July +21 °C. The absolute recorded minimum has been -36 °C and the maximum +42 °C. But in fact, due to Climate Change, in recent years it can be +15 °C in  mid January. Even during July or August the northern countryside remains moderately hot. Traditional Moldovan houses made of natural clay with straw (in Moldovan "lampach") provide cool conditions in the summer.

Transport
Moldova is internationally connected by plane to Chișinău International Airport. Direct flights from and to many European destinations exist.

Chișinău is also internationally connected by rail. Direct overnight trains exist to Romania (one daily train to Bucharest), Ukraine (one daily train to Odessa), and Russia (one daily train via Kyiv to Moscow).

The main means of transportation in Moldova is the highway system. Since Moldova is a small country (450 km from south to north, 200 km from west to east) one may get around by taxi. Car rental is available in bigger cities. There are also national and international bus connections.

The Giurgiulești terminal on the Danube is compatible with small seagoing vessels. Shipping on the lower Prut and Nistru rivers plays only a modest role in the country's transportation system.

In Chișinău there is a public trolleybus system. Most cities also offer public transport in the form of Minibuses (rutierele in Moldovan Romanian; marshrutki in Russian).

Telecommunication 
As of September 2020, 4G mobile coverage covers 97% of the country, providing mobile internet speeds of up to 150 Mb/s.

Broadband internet speed reaches 65.76 Mb/s.

Security 
Officially, Moldova is in 59th place out of 133 countries in the security rating.

Touristic Logo 

In 2014, Moldova introduced a new tourism logo and along with the new slogan "Discover the routes of life". It was developed with USAID assistance.

UNESCO World Heritage sites
 List of World Heritage Sites in Moldova

Intangible Cultural Heritage 

 Cultural practices associated with 1 March
 The Christmas carols in masculine horde
 Traditional wall-carpet craftsmanship

See also
 Extreme points of Moldova
 Medical tourism in the Republic of Moldova
 Moldovan cuisine 
 Moldovan wine

References

External links
 moldova.travel
 
 

 
Moldova